Jou-sous-Monjou is a commune in the Cantal department in south-central France. It is 25 km east of Aurillac.

Population

See also
Communes of the Cantal department

References

Communes of Cantal